USS Marlboro  (APB-38) was a Benewah-class self-propelled barracks ship of the United States Navy.

Ship history
Authorized to be built as APL-38 on 17 December 1943, Marlboro was redesignated APB-38 on 8 August 1944. She was laid down by the Boston Navy Yard at Boston, Massachusetts, on 25 August 1944 and launched on 17 November 1944; sponsored by Mrs. Marjorie Guile. Marlboro was commissioned 18 August 1945. Assigned to the Atlantic Fleet, Marlboro departed Boston 14 September for shakedown in Chesapeake Bay. On 15 October Marlboro got underway from Naval Operating Base, Norfolk, Virginia, for duty with the Service Force out of New York City. She served as a barracks ship along the East Coast to the end of the year. On 8 January 1946, she steamed for the Caribbean, arriving 5 days later at Guantanamo, Cuba, where she remained until sailing 15 May with U.S. Marines embarked for the East Coast. Marlboro reached Norfolk on the 20th.

Fate
Eight days later, she moved on to Green Cove Springs, Florida, anchoring on 30 May. Assigned to the Atlantic Reserve Fleet on 1 June, she was decommissioned in January 1947 and was berthed on the St. Johns River. Marlboro was struck from the Naval Register on 1 December 1963 and scrapped in 1965.

Awards

American Campaign Medal
World War II Victory Medal

References

External links
TogetherWeServed, APB-38 U.S.S. Marlboro
Shipbuilding Records, APB-38
Page 8, Shipbuilding records, Charleston Navy Yard, 2005

1944 ships
Ships built in Boston
Benewah-class barracks ships
Marlboro County, South Carolina
Atlantic Reserve Fleet, Green Cove Springs Group